Coleophora argopleura is a moth of the family Coleophoridae. It is found in northern Pakistan, Kashmir and north-eastern Afghanistan.

The wingspan is about 18 mm. The head and thorax are white. The palpi are white, with the second joint with scales hardly projecting at the apex beneath. The antennae are white, although the basal joint is roughly tufted anteriorly with long scales. The stalk is clothed with long rough scales above towards the base. The abdomen is ochreous-whitish. The forewings are lanceolate and ochreous-yellow, towards the costa suffused with fuscous. The hindwings are dark grey.

References

argopleura
Moths described in 1917
Moths of Asia